Eduardas is a Lithuanian masculine given name. People bearing the name Eduardas include:
Eduardas Eismuntas (born 1932), Lithuanian-Soviet KGB officer 
Eduardas Kurskis (born 1976), Lithuanian footballer 
Eduardas Rozentalis (born 1963), Lithuanian chess grandmaster
Eduardas Vilkas (1935–2008), Lithuanian economist and politician

References

Lithuanian masculine given names